Brian Campbell Vickery (New South Wales, Australia, 11 September 1918 – 17 October 2009) was a British information scientist and classification researcher, and Professor and director at the School of Library, Archive and Information Studies at University College London from 1973 to 1983.

Biography
Vickery was born in New South Wales in Australia, where his father Adam McCay  was working as journalist, and his uncle James Whiteside McCay was an  Australian general and later politician. Vickery went to schools in Australia, Cairo in Egypt, and Canterbury in England. He received his MA in Chemistry from Oxford University in 1941. He started his career as plant chemist in the explosives factory of the Royal Ordnance in Bridgwater, Somerset in 1941. In 1945 he married Manuletta McMenamin.

After the war he was assistant editor of the Industrial Chemist review in London, England, for one year. In 1946 he started his career as librarian at the Akers Research Laboratories of the Imperial Chemical Industries in Welwyn, Hertfordshire, England, where he worked until 1960. Here he started writing about library science, which resulted in a series of books. In 1960 he became principal scientific officer at the UK National Lending Library for Science and Technology in Boston Spa in Yorkshire, and from 1964 to 1966 he was librarian at the University of Manchester Institute of Science and Technology in Manchester. In 1967 he married Alina Vickery. From 1966 to 1973 he was research director at Aslib in London, and finally  from 1973 to 1983 he was professor and director, School of Library, Archive and Information Studies, University College London. After 1983, as professor emeritus of the University of London, he remained active as part-time consultant and kept writing.

Works 
Vickery wrote a series of books about library science and related subjects A selection:
 1953. Recent Trends in Special Libraries, 1953
 1958. Classification and Indexing in Science, eds. 1958, 1959, 1975
 1960. Faceted Classification, 1960
 1960. The National Lending Library for Science and Technology, 1960
 1961. On Retrieval System Theory, eds. 1961, 1965
 1966. Faceted Classification Schemes, 1966
 1970. Techniques of Information Retrieval, 1970
 1971. Computer Support for Parliamentary Information Service (with H.East), 1971
 1973. Information Systems, 1973
 1978. The Use of Online Search in Teaching, 1978
 1982. Information System Dynamics (with R.G.Heseltine), 1982
 1987. Information Science in Theory and Practice (with A.Vickery), eds. 1987, 1992, 2004
 1991. Intelligent Intermediary System: reference functional model, 1991
 1993. Online Search Interface Design (with A.Vickery), 1993
 2000. Scientific Communication in History, 2000
 2004. A Long Search for Information, 2004

See also
 Classification Research Group

References

External links
 
 
 Professor Brian Vickery 1918 - 2009 at iskouk.blogspot, 2010
 Remembering a Colleague: Brian Vickery, 2010

1918 births
2009 deaths
British information theorists